Cernia is a monotypic moth genus in the family Geometridae. Its only species, Cernia amyclaria, is found in Australia. Both the genus and species were described by Francis Walker in 1860.

References

Oenochrominae
Monotypic moth genera